Oliver Augustini (born 12 June 1990) is a Slovak football midfielder who currently plays for ASV Siegendorf.

Club career
Augustini started off career in Dubnica, which is not far his hometown Ilava.

He was transferred to Spartak Trnava in January 2013. He made his debut for them against Nitra on 2 March 2013.

External links
MFK Dubnica profile

References

1990 births
Living people
People from Ilava
Sportspeople from the Trenčín Region
Slovak footballers
Slovak expatriate footballers
Slovakia youth international footballers
FK Dubnica players
FC Spartak Trnava players
FK Iskra Borčice players
Slovak Super Liga players
2. Liga (Slovakia) players
Association football midfielders
Expatriate footballers in Austria
Slovak expatriate sportspeople in Austria